Thongbanh Sengaphone (2 May 1953 – 17 May 2014) was a Laotian politician and member of the Lao People's Revolutionary Party (LPRP). He served as Minister of Public Security and concurrently held seats in the LPRP's Central Committee (appointed at the 7th Congress of the Lao People's Revolutionary Party) and the Secretariat (appointed at the 8th Party Congress).

On 17 May 2014, Sengaphone died when the plane he was traveling on crashed in northern Laos. He was traveling to Xiangkhouang Province to attend a ceremony celebrating the 55th anniversary of the second division of the Lao People's Army.

References

Lao People's Revolutionary Party politicians
Members of the 7th Central Committee of the Lao People's Revolutionary Party
Members of the 8th Central Committee of the Lao People's Revolutionary Party
Members of the 9th Central Committee of the Lao People's Revolutionary Party
Members of the 8th Executive Committee of the Lao People's Revolutionary Party
Members of the 9th Secretariat of the Lao People's Revolutionary Party
Governors of Bolikhamsai
Government ministers of Laos
1953 births
2014 deaths
Victims of aviation accidents or incidents in Laos